Erika Lynn Brown (born January 25, 1973) is an American curler, currently residing in Oakville, Ontario, Canada. She started curling in 1980 and throws right-handed.

Career
As a 15-year-old, Brown represent the United States at the 1988 Winter Olympics when curling was a demonstration event. Brown played third on the team, skipped by Lisa Schoeneberg, and the team finished fifth. Brown then had a successful junior career, representing the United States at six (1988, 1989, 1991, 1992, 1993, 1994) World Junior Curling Championships, winning silver in 1992 and 1994 and a bronze in 1993.

Brown has participated in sixteen different United States National Championships, beginning with a second-place finish in 1991. In 1995 she won her first national championships and would go on to compete in the 1995 Brandon World Championships where her team placed fifth with a 4–5 record. Her second trip to the world championships proved more successful as her team won the silver medal behind Team Canada in 1996. She picked up a second World Championship silver medal in 1999 as the third for Patti Lank's team.

Brown competed at the 2010 US Olympic Trials, finishing fourth in the round robin portion of the tournament. In the 3 vs. 4 playoff she faced her former skip Patti Lank, but lost.

Upon their win at the 2013 United States Women's Curling Championship, Brown and her team were qualified to participate at the 2014 United States Olympic Curling Trials. They finished first in the round robin standings and defeated Allison Pottinger in a best-of-three series final to clinch the berth to the Olympics.

At the 2014 Winter Olympics, she led her American team to a 10th-place finish, with a 1–8 record.

Brown's team won the United States Women's Curling Championship in back-to-back years in 2015 and 2016. At the 2016 World Women's Curling Championship they finished in 6th place. In June 2016 Brown announced her retirement from competitive curling.

Personal life
Brown attended La Follette High School in Madison, Wisconsin. Brown is married to three-time curling world champion Ian Tetley. Her brother Craig is also an Olympic curler. She works as a physician assistant in Hamilton, Ontario. She has three children.

Teams

Grand Slam record

Former events

References

External links
 

1973 births
American female curlers
American emigrants to Canada
Curlers at the 2014 Winter Olympics
Living people
Olympic curlers of the United States
Curlers from Ontario
Sportspeople from Oakville, Ontario
Sportspeople from Madison, Wisconsin
American curling champions
Continental Cup of Curling participants
Curlers at the 1988 Winter Olympics
Curlers at the 1998 Winter Olympics